The Eswatini women's national under-16 basketball team is a national basketball team of Eswatini, administered by the Swaziland National Basketball Association.
It represents the country in women's international under-16 (under age 16) basketball competitions.

It appeared at the 2009 FIBA Africa Under-16 Championship for Women qualifying round.

See also
Eswatini men's national under-16 basketball team

References

External links
Swaziland Basketball Records at FIBA Archive

under
Women's national under-16 basketball teams